"", Op. 27, No. 1, is the first in a set of four songs composed by Richard Strauss in 1894. It was originally for voice and piano, and not orchestrated by Strauss until 1948, after he had completed one of his Four Last Songs, "". The words are from a poem "" (Rest, my soul) written by the poet Karl Henckell.

History 

Strauss composed the song in May 1894, and that September he gave it as a wedding present to his wife the soprano Pauline de Ahna.

Related songs
Timothy L. Jackson has noted that Strauss had composed the song "Ruhe, meine Seele!" for piano and voice in 1894 but did not orchestrate it until 1948, just after he had completed "Im Abendrot" and before he composed the other three of his Four Last Songs. Jackson suggests that the addition of "Ruhe, meine Seele!" to the Four Last Songs forms a five-song unified song cycle, if "Ruhe, meine Seele!" is performed as a prelude to "Im Abendrot", to which it bears motivic similarity.

Instrumentation and accompaniment
The instrumentation is: piccolo, 2 flutes, 2 oboes, cor anglais, 2 clarinets in B, bass clarinet, 2 bassoons, 4 horns in F, 2 trumpets in C, 3 trombones, tuba, 3 timpani, celesta, harp and the orchestral string section.

The accompaniment has sombre and ambiguous harmonies, with contrasting calm and tempestuous episodes, but ends peacefully in the home key of C major.

Lyrics

Opus 27 
The other songs of Opus 27 are:
 Op. 27 No. 2 "Cäcilie" (Wenn du es wüßtest) 
 Op. 27 No. 3 "Heimliche Aufforderung" (Auf, hebe die funkelnde Schale)
 Op. 27 No. 4 "Morgen!" (Und morgen wird die Sonne wieder scheinen)

Recordings 
Richard Strauss recorded it twice with himself accompanying on the piano. In 1919 with the baritone Heinrich Schlusnus and again in 1944, with the baritone Alfred Poell.

References and notes

External links 
 
 The LiederNet Archive: "Rest my soul", English translation by Emily Ezust

Orchestral accompaniment
, Jessye Norman
, Elisabeth Schwarzkopf

Piano accompaniment
, Alfred Poell
, Kiri Te Kanawa
, Dima Orsho
, Richard Tauber
, Helen Traubel
, Birgit Nilsson

Songs by Richard Strauss
Music dedicated to family or friends
1894 songs
Compositions in C major